Threads is a 1932 British drama film directed by G.B. Samuelson and starring Lawrence Anderson, Dorothy Fane and Wendy Barrie. It was shot at Cricklewood Studios near London and was released by United Artists.

Cast
 Lawrence Anderson as John Osborne Wynn
 Dorothy Fane as Amelia Wynn
 Gerald Rawlinson as 	Arthur
 Leslie Cole as James
 Wendy Barrie as 	Olive Wynn
 Ben Webster as 	Lord Grathers
 Irene Rooke as 	Lady Grathers
 Aileen Despard as 	Chloe
 Pat Reid as Parsons
 Clifford Cobbe as Jefferson Jordan
 Walter Piers as Colonel Packinder

References

Bibliography
 Low, Rachael. Filmmaking in 1930s Britain. George Allen & Unwin, 1985.
 Wood, Linda. British Films, 1927-1939. British Film Institute, 1986.

External links

1932 films
British drama films
1932 drama films
1930s English-language films
Films shot at Cricklewood Studios
British black-and-white films
1930s British films
United Artists films
Films directed by G. B. Samuelson